Hooshang Amirahmadi (born May 24, 1947) is an Iranian American academic and political analyst. Amirahmadi is a professor of the Edward J. Bloustein School of Planning and Public Policy, at Rutgers University. He has stepped forward as a candidate for Iranian presidential elections in 2005, 2013 and 2017.

Career 
Amirahmadi is the founder and president of American–Iranian Council, holds a Ph.D. in planning and international development from Cornell University and is a professor of the Edward J. Bloustein School of Planning and Public Policy at Rutgers University. He has served as director of Rutgers University's Center for Middle Eastern Studies, as chair and graduate director of his department at the Bloustein School, and as the University Coordinator of the Hubert Humphrey Fellowship Program. Amirahmadi is also a founder of the Center for Iranian Research and Analysis and served as its director for many years. Amirahmadi is also the president of Caspian Associates, Inc., an international strategic consulting firm headquartered in Princeton, New Jersey.

Amirahmadi is a recognized expert on Iranian affairs, and has been called on to comment on this topic in national media.

Publications 
Amirahmadi has published extensively on the topic of Middle-Eastern relations. He is the author of Revolution and Economic Transition: The Iranian Experience, an analysis of post-revolutionary Iran, and the three other books in Persian on civil society, industrial policy, and geopolitics of energy. He is also editor of ten books on Iran and the Greater Middle East, and 16 conference proceedings on US-Iran relations.

Presidential candidacy 
He registered as a candidate for President in the Ninth Presidential Election in Iran in June 2005.

Amirahmadi was the presidential candidate of a reformist platform for the 2013 Iranian presidential elections.

Amirahmadi supported normalizing Iranian relations with the US, and using the opportunity for   economic development. He supports gender equality and female career advancement. If elected, Amirahmadi's administration would have supported creating a coalition government in Syria.

On 21 May 2013, Iran's Guardian Council rejected him and many others from the list of approved candidates.

He announced his candidacy for the presidency for the third time in the 2017 election. His third bid was also rejected and he was disqualified.

Bibliography

References

External links 
 Campaign Site
 Biography at the Rutgers University Edward J. Bloustein School
 Caspian Associates

University of Tabriz alumni
1947 births
Living people
Iranian people of Talysh descent
Cornell University College of Architecture, Art, and Planning alumni
Iranian expatriate academics
Rutgers University faculty
Iranian emigrants to the United States